Thalassotalea euphylliae  is a Gram-negative, aerobic, rod-shaped and motile bacterium from the genus of Thalassotalea with a single polar flagellum which has been isolated from the coral Euphyllia glabrescens.

References

External links
Type strain of Thalassotalea euphylliae at BacDive -  the Bacterial Diversity Metadatabase

 

Alteromonadales
Bacteria described in 2016